Snake Byte is video game written by Chuck Sommerville for the Apple II and published by Sirius Software in 1982. The game is a single-player variant of the snake concept. That same year, Snake Byte was released for the Atari 8-bit family and on cartridge for the VIC-20. A Commodore 64 version followed in 1983.

Gameplay
The player controls a snake, crawling into a rectangular area. At the start of the game the snake has three lives and gains a life when it successfully exits a level. The goal is to eat 10 apples in each of the 28 levels. If an apple is not eaten during the given deadline, three extra apples are to be eaten. The snake becomes longer and moves more quickly with each apple eaten. The snake loses a life when crashing into a fence, the wall or itself. After the last apple in each round is eaten the snake must exit the area through a gate which appears. Higher levels have more complicated fences, making the area trickier to navigate. 

Levels are increasingly difficult and the last ones allow almost no mistakes at all. Level 29 wraps back to level 1, but the counter does not reset. After completing enough levels the display will go from 99 to 00.

The game can be played in two modes: two-key (left/right) or four-key (left/right/up/down), with 0, 1 or 2 bouncing plums. Plums bounce around within the area and kill the snake when they hit its head.

Reception
Ahoy! gave Snake Byte grades of B− for graphics and A for gameplay. It stated that the game "is one of the most engaging and challenging programs you can buy... you can't hope to do better in terms of entertainment."

References

1982 video games
Apple II games
Atari 8-bit family games
Commodore 64 games
VIC-20 games
Sirius Software games
Snake video games
Video games about reptiles
Video games developed in the United States
Single-player video games